The members of the 28th Manitoba Legislature were elected in the Manitoba general election held in June 1966. The legislature sat from December 5, 1966, to May 22, 1969.

The Progressive Conservative Party led by Duff Roblin formed the government. Walter Weir became Premier in 1967 after Roblin resigned to run unsuccessfully for the federal Progressive Conservative Party leadership.

Gildas Molgat of the Liberal Party was Leader of the Opposition.

A new sales tax of 5% was introduced effective June 1, 1967.

James Bilton served as speaker for the assembly.

There were three sessions of the 28th Legislature:

Richard Spink Bowles was Lieutenant Governor of Manitoba.

Members of the Assembly 
The following members were elected to the assembly in 1966:

Notes:

By-elections 
By-elections were held to replace members for various reasons:

Notes:

References 

Terms of the Manitoba Legislature
1966 establishments in Manitoba
1969 disestablishments in Manitoba